John-Paul Davidson  is a director, producer and writer for television and film. He was born in London and after attending Bristol University, The University of Malaya and San Francisco Art Institute he went on to work for the BBC for a number of years before becoming a freelance director, specialising in documentary film making.

In 2018 he directed narrative feature film «The Thin Man» which has since been retitled «The Man in the Hat»   in France alongside Oscar-winning composer Stephen Warbeck starring Ciarán Hinds and Stephen Dillane.

Filmography
Stephen Fry in Central America (2015) director/producer  TV mini series 
Seve - the movie  [2014] director movie 
Brazil with Michael Palin (2012) director TV documentary mini series 
Sting's Winter Songbook (2010) TV documentary 
Down By The River  with Hugh Laurie (2011), TV documentary     
 Fry's Planet Word (2011 Director/Series Producer) TV documentary series
Last Chance to See (2009 Director) (mini) TV nature series
Stephen Fry In America (2008 Director/Series Producer) (mini) TV documentary series
Michael Palin's New Europe (2007 director) (mini) TV documentary series
Catherine the Great (2005, writer, producer and director) (TV movie)
Himalaya with Michael Palin (2004, director) (mini) TV documentary series
Sahara with Michael Palin (2002, director) (mini) TV documentary series
The Sweatbox (2002, producer and director)movie
Raging Planet Episode: "Blizzard" (1997, director) TV episode
The Grotesque (1995, director) movie
Boys from Brazil (1993, director) TV movie
Galahad of Everest (1991, director) movie

References

External links
 

Living people
British television producers
British television writers
British film directors
British film producers
British television directors
Place of birth missing (living people)
1953 births